Mladen Kovačević (born 30 December 1994) is a Serbian footballer who plays as a forward.

Career statistics

References

1994 births
Living people
Serbian footballers
Serbian expatriate footballers
Association football forwards
Serbian First League players
China League One players
FK Radnički Sombor players
FK Ozren Sokobanja players
OFK Bečej 1918 players
Nantong Zhiyun F.C. players
FK Radnički Niš players
Serbian expatriate sportspeople in China
Expatriate footballers in China